Thekla (minor planet designation: 586 Thekla) is a minor planet orbiting the Sun.
It was named after Saint Thecla of the first century. The name may have been inspired by the asteroid's provisional designation 1906 TC.

References

External links
 Lightcurve plot of 586 Thekla, Palmer Divide Observatory, B. D. Warner (1999)
 Asteroid Lightcurve Database (LCDB), query form (info )
 Dictionary of Minor Planet Names, Google books
 Asteroids and comets rotation curves, CdR – Observatoire de Genève, Raoul Behrend
 Discovery Circumstances: Numbered Minor Planets (1)-(5000) – Minor Planet Center
 
 

Background asteroids
Thekla
Thekla
C-type asteroids (Tholen)
Ch-type asteroids (SMASS)
19060221